Apotistatus is a genus of moth in the family Gelechiidae. It contains the species Apotistatus leucostictus, which is found in Algeria.

The wingspan is 10–12 mm. The forewings are pale brownish ochreous, spangled with white, the white spangles evenly distributed over the wing, forming a marginal line around the termen and slightly concentrated across the apical third from the costa to the dorsum, but failing to form any complete fascia. The hindwings are silvery white.

References

Gelechiinae
Monotypic moth genera
Moths of Africa